Appleton is a village in the civil parish of Appleton-with-Eaton, about  northwest of Abingdon. Appleton was part of Berkshire until the 1974 boundary changes transferred it to Oxfordshire. The 2011 Census recorded Appleton-with-Eaton's parish population as 915.

Manor
In the 9th century Abingdon Abbey held the manor of Appleton. In 871 the Danes sacked the abbey and thereby obtained Appleton, but it is assumed that Appleton was recovered by Alfred the Great.

Appleton's toponym means "an orchard". In the 10th century it was Æppeltune or Appeltun, from then until the 17th century it evolved as Apletone, Apletune and Appelton, and in 1316 it was recorded as Aspelton. In the 10th century the village had the alternative name of Earmundeslæh, Earmundesleah, Earmundeslee or Earmundeslei, referring to King Edmund I, who in 942 granted it to Athelstan, one of his thegns, who may have restored it to Abingdon Abbey.

The Domesday Book of 1086 records that Miles Crispin was the manorial overlord of Appleton and Eaton. There was also a second landholding at Appleton of which the overlord was Odo, Bishop of Bayeux, who was William of Normandy's half-brother. The Domesday Book records that Appleton had the most valuable fishery in Berkshire, valued at £1.4s.2d.

From then on the history is largely a record of grants and reversions, the best-known names to appear in the list of grantors or tenants being William de Merton, perhaps a kinsman of the founder of Merton College, Oxford, Sir William de Shareshull, Lord Chief Justice in the reign of Edward III, and William Lenthall, Speaker of the Long Parliament (this at a time when the Lordship of the Manor descended with that of Besselsleigh) and, of more local note, the Fettiplace and the Southby families.

Appleton Manor House dates from about 1174 and has an ornate doorway. The Grade-II*-listed house has a porch and fireplace that were added in the Tudor era.

Parish church
The oldest parts of the Church of England parish church of Saint Laurence are 12th-century Norman. The north aisle was added late in that century, linked with the nave by a four-bay arcade of pointed arches. In the 13th century a new window and doorway were inserted in the south wall of the nave, as was the priest's doorway on the south side of the chancel. The east window of the chancel is 14th-century in style. In the 15th century the Perpendicular Gothic bell tower was added, a window inserted on the south side of the nave and the nave was re-roofed. The south porch was added early in the 16th century, the north aisle was rebuilt in the 17th century and the north porch was built in about 1700. The Gothic Revival architect CC Rolfe restored the nave in 1882–84. The church is a Grade II* listed building.

Monuments in the church include a brass of two shrouded corpses in memory of John Goudrington, who died in 1518, and his wife. In the chancel is a Renaissance stone monument erected in 1593 in memory of Sir John Fettiplace, who died in 1580. It includes a life-size effigy of Sir John in 16th-century armour, a pair of Corinthian columns supporting a canopy surmounted by a pair of obelisks, and a long Latin inscription surrounded by extensive strapwork and a number of skulls.

The tower has a ring of ten bells, all cast by the Whitechapel Bell Foundry. Thomas II Mears cast the seventh bell in 1817. George Mears cast the second and third bells in 1859 and the ninth and tenor bells in 1861. Mears and Stainbank recast the eighth bell in 1874 and cast the treble, fourth and fifth bells in 1875. The sixth bell was recast, and the fittings for all bells replaced, and a new frame installed in 1977. The work was carried out by White's of Appleton, in the same village.

White's of Appleton
In 1824 Alfred White founded White's of Appleton, a contractor for hanging church bells. The company is still based in Appleton and is now the oldest bellhanging company still trading in the United Kingdom.

Amenities

Appleton has a Church of England primary school, a community shop, a Women's Institute and a cricket club.

Appleton All Stars Football Club was a member of the North Berks Football League. The club was dissolved in 2014.

Oxfordshire County Council subsidised bus route 63 between Oxford and Southmoor serves Appleton five times a day in each direction from Monday to Friday. There is no service on Saturday, Sunday, or Bank Holidays. The current contractor operating the route is Thames Travel.

References

Sources

External links

Appleton with Eaton

Villages in Oxfordshire